Santa Rosa was a  built in Alameda, California, for Northwestern Pacific Railroad. She started out serving Southern Pacific Railways on their Golden Gate Ferries line on San Francisco Bay.

She was purchased by the Puget Sound Navigation Company in 1940, and moved to Puget Sound.  Puget Sound Navigation Company, believing that a single ended ferry would be more economical and faster, replaced her engines and converted her to a single-ended ferry, effectively making her no longer a true Steel Electric-class ferry.  She was also renamed MV Enetai, which is the name she kept when she was later acquired by Washington State Ferries who took over operations in 1951. The ferry was returned to San Francisco after her sale in 1968, but sat largely unused until purchased by Hornblower Cruises in 1989. Hornblower restored her aft wheelhouse in an attempt to make her look like her original profile from 1927, however the passenger cabin retained the remodeled outline from her 1941 single-end conversion.  She is currently moored at Pier 3 in San Francisco, where she serves as office space  for Hornblower's Northern California Operations and also as Corporate Headquarters for Hornblower's suite of companies which include:
 Hornblower Cruises & Events
 Alcatraz Cruises
 Statue Cruises
 Niagara Cruises
 Liberty Landing Ferry
 Hornblower Classic Cable Cars
 NYC Ferry Service
The Ferryboat Santa Rosa has since been retired from rental events.

References

External links 
 with the National Park Service (pdf)
 with the National Park Service (pdf)

Ferries of California
Ships built in Alameda, California
1927 ships
Washington State Ferries vessels
Ships of the United States
National Register of Historic Places in San Francisco
Ships on the National Register of Historic Places in California